Hans Andreasen may refer to:

 Hans Edward Andreasen (born 1983), Faroese musician
 Hans Henrik Andreasen (born 1979), Danish footballer